He Zishu (1901–1932) was a member of the 28 Bolsheviks. He was born in Hubei Province and educated in Wuhan. He was introduced by Dong Biwu into the Communist Party of China. In 1927, he went to the Soviet Union to study at Moscow Sun Yat-sen University. In 1930, he was a member of the Communist Party organization for Northern China. He was betrayed in 1931 and arrested by the Kuomintang in Tianjin in 1931. He was executed by firing squad the next year.

References
二十八个半布尔什维克中的广水人——何子述. 中共广水市委组织部. [2012-05-28].
1901 births
1932 deaths
Moscow Sun Yat-sen University alumni